Theobald the Elder (Thibaud l'Ancien, c. 890 – c. 940) was a Count of Chartres in medieval France.

Biography
Theobald the Elder is said to have purchased the County of Chartres from Sea-King Hasting and established a hereditary government there in the late 9th century. He is most well known as being the father of Theobald I, Count of Blois who tried to usurp Richard I in 960.

Family
Theobald the Elder had two children with his wife, Richildis.

Theobald I, Count of Blois (913–978)
Richard of Blois, Archbishop of Bourges (d.969)

References

Sources

890 births
940 deaths
Counts of Chartres
House of Blois

Year of birth uncertain
Year of death uncertain